Jolanta Bartczak (born 20 March 1964) is a retired Polish long jumper.

Her personal best jump was 6.90 metres, achieved in June 1988 in Bratislava.

Her daughter, Pia Skrzyszowska, is a hurdler.

International competitions

References

1964 births
Living people
Polish female long jumpers
Athletes (track and field) at the 1988 Summer Olympics
Olympic athletes of Poland
People from Ozorków
Sportspeople from Łódź Voivodeship